The Bus  is a reality television show created by Endemol, in which a group of people live together in a large and luxury bus, isolated from the outside world but continuously watched by television cameras. 

Each series lasts for around three months. The contestants try to win a cash prize by avoiding periodic evictions from the bus. The first The Bus broadcast was in the Netherlands in 2000 on the SBS 6 TV channel.

The Bus around the world

See also

 List of television show franchises

Notes

External links

Television series by Endemol
Endemol Shine Group franchises
2000 Dutch television series debuts
2000s reality television series
2010s reality television series
Reality television series franchises
SBS6 original programming

es:El bus
pt:Busão do Brasil